Disney's Animal Kingdom Theme Park is a zoological theme park at the Walt Disney World Resort in Bay Lake, Florida, near Orlando. Owned and operated by The Walt Disney Company through its Parks, Experiences and Products division, it is the largest theme park in the world, covering . The park opened on Earth Day, April 22, 1998, and was the fourth theme park built at the resort. The park is dedicated and themed around natural environment and animal conservation, a philosophy once pioneered by Walt Disney.

Disney's Animal Kingdom distinguishes itself from the rest of Walt Disney World's theme parks by featuring traditional attractions as well as hundreds of species of live animals. Special designs and provisions were incorporated throughout the park to protect the animals' welfare. The park is located on the western edge of the resort and is isolated from the other theme parks and properties to minimize external disruptions to the animals; as a result, the park's former nighttime show did not feature fireworks that would otherwise disturb the animals. In efforts to be more eco-friendly, the park uses biodegradable paper straws and prohibits plastic straws, lids, and balloons. Disney's Animal Kingdom is accredited by the Association of Zoos and Aquariums and the World Association of Zoos and Aquariums, indicating they have met or exceeded the standards in education, conservation, and research.

In 2019, Disney's Animal Kingdom hosted 13.888 million guests, ranking it as the third-most-visited theme park in North America and the sixth-most-visited theme park in the world. It is the most-visited zoo in the world. The park is the second-most-visited at Walt Disney World Resort, behind Disney's Magic Kingdom.

History

Planning and construction
Disney began planning a new park shortly after the opening of MGM Studios in 1989. Animal Kingdom was the brainchild of Imagineer Joe Rohde, who had previously designed the Adventurers Club at Pleasure Island. When presenting the idea of the new animal-themed park, Rohde brought a 400-pound Bengal tiger into the meeting with Disney CEO Michael Eisner. Originally slated as Disney's "Wild Animal Kingdom," Disney announced plans for the construction of the park in 1995 at an estimated cost of $600-$800 million. To design the theme park, Disney Imagineers traveled to Africa and Asia to study the landscapes and wildlife.

In July 1996, construction was underway on the animal holding facilities, the installation of trees, shrubs, and grasses to shape the park's African Savanna-inspired landscape. Disney Imagineers collected seeds from 37 countries to be used for the plants and grasses in the park. The landscaping efforts included spreading four million cubic yards of dirt, planting 40,000 mature trees (a mix of real Savanna species and artificial Baobab trees), constructing 60 miles of underground utilities, and construction of various waterways, and structures built by over 2,600 construction workers. Many buildings contained thatched roofs assembled by Zulu workers from South Africa. About 1,500 hand-painted wooden horses were crafted in Bali under Disney supervision. Parts of the park were designed to have an aged appearance, with artificial potholes in the safari roads and boats peppered with dents and rust.

Most of the park's animals were acquired in 1997 during the fall; they were held at a rented holding facility in northern Florida for quarantine and observation. Disney hired staff from 69 zoos around the United States to care for the animals.

Operation

The park opened to the public on April 22, 1998. Several marketing events surrounded the day. ABC aired a two-hour prime time special about the making of Animal Kingdom, as part of its The Wonderful World of Disney anthology series. Eisner and Disney Vice Chairman Roy Disney hosted an opening day party for 14,000 corporate partners, travel agents, and media figures, which included celebrities such as Michael J. Fox, Drew Carey, Stevie Wonder, David Copperfield, and Jane Goodall. Broadcasts of Good Morning America, Today and Live with Regis and Kathie Lee aired live from the park on April 22. ABC also filmed an episode Sabrina the Teenage Witch at Animal Kingdom before the opening of the park; the episode, named "Disneyworld", aired two days after the park's opening.

In 2011, Disney announced a major expansion to the park, Pandora - The World of Avatar, a joint venture with director James Cameron and his production company, Lightstorm Entertainment, with the intention of transforming Animal Kingdom into a full-day operation with added attraction capacity and nighttime experiences. Construction on the area began on January 10, 2014, and the area opened to the public on May 27, 2017.

The park was closed from March 16 to July 11, 2020, due to the COVID-19 pandemic in Florida.

Park layout and attractions

Disney's Animal Kingdom is divided into seven themed areas. The park's Discovery River separates Discovery Island from the other lands. The park is home to approximately 2000 animals representing around 200 species.

Oasis
The Oasis is the park's logistic equivalent to Main Street U.S.A. and provides the transition from the park's entrance to the world of animals. The main paths feature animal exhibits and dense vegetation and trees lead deeper into the park and then onto Discovery Island. Between the parking lot and the Oasis sits a Rainforest Cafe, which can be entered from both inside and outside the ticketed area.

Discovery Island
Discovery Island is located at the center of the park and is an island within the park's Discovery River waterway. It serves as the "central hub" connecting the other sections of the park by bridges, with the exception of Rafiki's Planet Watch. It was originally called Safari Village, as Discovery Island was the name for the small zoological park located in Walt Disney World's Bay Lake but was renamed after that area closed in 1999.

The Tree of Life, the park's sculpted, man-made baobab tree, is located in this section and is surrounded by trails and animal enclosures. Inside the Tree of Life is It's Tough to Be a Bug!, a 4D film inspired by the 1998 Disney·Pixar animated film, A Bug's Life. The park's largest gift shops and two of its major restaurants are on Discovery Island.

Pandora – The World of Avatar 

Pandora – The World of Avatar is themed to the fictional exoplanetary moon, Pandora, from James Cameron's Avatar. The land's marquee attraction is Avatar Flight of Passage, a 3D flying thrill simulator that allows guests to fly on a banshee across the Pandoran landscape. Another attraction, the Na'vi River Journey, places guests aboard a boat dark ride through Pandora's bioluminescent rainforests. The area opened on May 27, 2017.

Africa 

Africa is one of the original areas of the park. Set in the fictional east African port village of Harambe, this area contains several animal exhibits. Some snippets from Africa that were duplicated by the Disney Imagineers included a fortress that was found in Zanzibar, and a water-stained, crumbling old building that was found in Kenya. Harambe includes a "hotel”, restaurants, an outdoor bar with live entertainment, and different marketplaces.

The village is the namesake of the Harambe Wildlife Preserve, the fictional home of the area's main attraction, Kilimanjaro Safaris. Guests climb aboard an open-sided safari vehicle for an expedition to see African species in several large field enclosures, replicating the African savannas, rivers and rocky hills. The safari features the okapi, greater kudu, saddle-billed stork, bongo, black and white rhinoceros, hippopotamus, pink-backed pelican, Nile crocodile, Masai giraffe, blue wildebeest, springbok, Ankole cattle, common eland, sable antelope, and African bush elephant.

On the adjacent Gorilla Falls Exploration Trail, visitors trek into the forest to see animals such as the Western lowland gorilla, black-and-white colobus monkey, okapi, gerenuk, yellow-backed duiker, pygmy hippopotamus, Grévy's zebra, South African meerkat, Kenyan sand boa, kori bustard, naked mole-rat, tarantulas, and, as well as an aviary. On the western side of the Africa area is the Harambe Theater, which is home to the Festival of the Lion King, a stage attraction based on Disney's 1994 film, The Lion King.

Rafiki's Planet Watch
Rafiki's Planet Watch is the only section of the park not connected to Discovery Island; it connects only to Africa. Guests board the  narrow-gauge Wildlife Express Train for the short trip to and from the area, which consists of three sub-areas.

Guests first encounter Habitat Habit!, where there are cotton-top tamarins.

Conservation Station showcases the various conservation efforts supported by the Walt Disney Company. It also gives a behind-the-scenes glimpse into Disney's Animal Kingdom's animal care facilities, including a veterinary examination room complete with a two-way communications system so the veterinary staff can answer guest questions.

Outside, Affection Section is a petting zoo featuring goats, sheep, cattle, domestic pigs, donkeys, and alpacas.

The area also includes The Animation Experience at Conservation Station.

Asia

Asia, the first expansion area added to Disney's Animal Kingdom, opened in 1999. This area is set in the fictional kingdom of ‘Anandapur’, which means "place of many delights" in Sanskrit. Anandapur evokes the traits of Cambodia, India, Indonesia, Mongolia, Nepal, and Thailand. According to Disney history, Anandapur was established as a royal hunting preserve in 1544. Asia contains both the riverside village of Anandapur and Serka Zong, which is set in the foothills of the Himalayas.

The visual focal point of Asia is Expedition Everest, a steel roller coaster ride. Nearby is Kali River Rapids, a river rapids ride. The Maharajah Jungle Trek leads guests through the forests and ruins outside the village, which are home to species such as the Javan banteng, bar-headed goose, Sumatran tiger, Indian blackbuck, Sumatran orangutan, Eld's deer, white-handed gibbon, Indian flying fox, Komodo dragon and over 50 bird species. Feathered Friends in Flight is a live bird show featuring birds such as the black crowned crane and bald eagle.

DinoLand U.S.A.
DinoLand U.S.A. is themed around dinosaurs and other extinct prehistoric life. The area is anchored by the Dino Institute, a fictitious palaeontological facility which is home to Dinosaur, a dark thrill ride loosely inspired by the 2000 Disney animated film of the same name, featuring a trip through time to the Late Cretaceous. Just outside the institute is "Dino-Sue", a casting of a Tyrannosaurus rex fossil that is the most complete yet found. At the nearby Boneyard, there is a playground area with a Columbian mammoth fossil and a cast skeleton of a Brachiosaurus. 

Adjacent to the Institute and its surrounding facilities is Chester and Hester's Dino-Rama, which recalls the many roadside attractions that were once scattered throughout the United States. The area features the TriceraTop Spin aerial carousel ride, carnival games and gift shops. At the eastern edge of DinoLand U.S.A. is the Theater in the Wild, which hosts Finding Nemo – The Musical (which was retitled Finding Nemo: The Big Blue........ and Beyond!), a live action musical stage show based on the story of the 2003 Disney·Pixar animated film Finding Nemo.

Like the other sections of Disney's Animal Kingdom, there are animals on display. The animals, such as the American crocodile, red legged seriemas, Abdim's stork and Asian brown tortoise, have evolutionary links to the age of the dinosaurs. They are animal species that have survived since the dinosaur era and can be found along the Cretaceous Trail along with a collection of Mesozoic plants.

Former and unbuilt areas

Camp Minnie-Mickey
Camp Minnie-Mickey was themed as a rustic summer camp, built as a placeholder on the location where Beastly Kingdom was intended to be built. The area closed on January 5, 2014, and was replaced by Pandora – The World of Avatar.

Beastly Kingdom
When originally conceived, Disney's Animal Kingdom was to focus on three broad classifications of animals: those that exist in today's reality; those that did exist but are now extinct (i.e., dinosaurs); and those that only exist in the realm of fantasy such as unicorns and dragons. The original design for Animal Kingdom included a themed section called Beastly Kingdom, devoted to creatures of legend and mythology. During the final stages of planning of development, Eisner decided that either Beastly Kingdom or Dinoland USA would be built first because of budget cuts after the failure of Euro Disney (known today as Disneyland Paris) and the higher cost of the upkeep and care of the animals at the park. Dinoland USA was chosen first mostly because of its lower budget. In 2000, Rohde said: "We had a vision and now it's become a placeholder. We have all kinds of ideas and not all of them fit with the theme of Beastly Kingdom. I'm not even convinced there will be a Beastly Kingdom."

Restaurants and shops

The park contains four table service restaurants:

 Rainforest Cafe, a themed restaurant chain operated by Landry's, located just outside the main entrance (also accessible from inside the park). It is one of the two Rainforest Cafes at the Walt Disney World Resort.
 Yak & Yeti, an Asian-themed restaurant located in the park's Asia section (also operated by Landry's).
 Tusker House, located in Africa and one of the park's original quick-service restaurants, was converted into a buffet restaurant.
 Tiffins, located on Discovery Island, features the themed Nomad Lounge adjacent to it.

There are seven quick-service restaurants located throughout the park:

 Flame Tree Barbecue on Discovery Island
 Pizzafari on Discovery Island
 Satu'li Canteen in Pandora – The World of Avatar
 Restaurantosaurus in DinoLand USA
 Tamu Tamu Refreshments in Africa
 Harambe Market in Africa
 Yak & Yeti Local Foods Café in Asia

As with other Walt Disney World theme parks, Disney's Animal Kingdom has other locations and carts that offer snacks and beverages.

Operations
The park typically closes earlier in the day than other parks in the Walt Disney World Resort; Animal Kingdom began to stay open through the evening on May 27, 2016.

Disney does not allow plastic straws, lids, or balloons to be used in the park, unlike the rest of the Disney parks. This is so that plastic does not inadvertently enter an animal's habitat and hurt them. Instead, the park uses biodegradable paper straws and offers lids for hot drinks only. The restrooms at Disney's Animal Kingdom all have doors at their entrances. This practice is in place so that, in the event of an animal escaping, guests are able to shelter safely inside.

Conservation efforts
As a zoological park, Disney's Animal Kingdom is engaged in research and conservation efforts involving its animal species. Since the park's opening in 1998, the resident elephant herd has produced seven calves, with births in 2003, 2004, 2005, 2008, 2010, 2011 and 2016. In 2008, the park's giraffe herd produced four newborns, raising the total number of giraffe births since opening to eleven.

In 1999, one of the park's white rhinoceros gave birth to a female calf named Nande. In 2006, Nande and Hasani, another of the park's rhinos, were transferred to Uganda's Ziwa animal sanctuary, in the first attempt to re-introduce white rhinos to the country. Civil strife had caused the white rhinoceros to be eradicated from the area. In June 2009, Nande gave birth to a male calf, the first such birth in Uganda in over 25 years. By January 2010, eight white rhinos had been born at Animal Kingdom since the park's opening; the most recent was born to another Animal Kingdom-born mother.

Controversy
Several Florida-based animal rights groups and PETA voiced concerns when the park originally opened, citing Walt Disney World's previous missteps in handling animals at the defunct Discovery Island. The groups protested, and PETA tried to convince travel agents not to book trips to the park. On opening day, the Orange County Sheriff's office sent about 150 deputies; about two dozen protesters showed up. The protest lasted two hours, and there were no arrests.

Following a U.S. Department of Agriculture (USDA) inspection of the park, it was revealed that 31 animals died at Animal Kingdom between September 1997 and April 1998 from accidents, poisonings, fights, and other causes. Two Asian small-clawed otters died after ingesting loquat seeds from trees planted in their exhibit; two cheetah cubs died from ethylene glycol poisoning; nine herd animals died from injuries caused by fights, being entangled in fences while trying to escape, and, in one case, being kicked by an ostrich. Two crowned cranes were killed after being run over by safari vehicles in two separate incidents. The USDA ultimately found no violations of animal-welfare regulations. Disney responded to the report by hiring additional security to prevent animals from fighting, relocating the crowned cranes to walking paths, as well as adding mirrors to the safari vehicles.

One year after the park opened, Animal Rights Foundation of Florida complained that a New Year's Eve fireworks show could upset the animals. A USDA inspector came to the park and found no problems with launching low-noise fireworks half a mile away. In January 2015, the animal rights group In Defense of Animals listed the park at number 10 on its 2014 "list of worst zoos for elephants."

Incidents
In October 2014, a snake dropped out of a tree and bit a boy, precipitating the death of his great-grandmother who suffered a cardiac arrest as a reaction to the attack. A lawsuit was threatened because of the incident but was never filed. The park confirmed that the snake that bit the boy was a non-venomous indigenous snake and that it did not escape from an enclosure.

Attendance

See also
 List of Disney's Animal Kingdom attractions
 Rail transport in Walt Disney Parks and Resorts

References

External links
 
 

 
Zoos in Florida
1998 establishments in Florida
Animal Kingdom
Animal Kingdom
Animal Kingdom
Zoos established in 1998
Amusement parks opened in 1998